Anne Simmons  is an Australian biomedical engineer. She has served as Provost at the University of New South Wales (UNSW) since 2019. Her research is focused on analysis of blood flow in diseased vessels and development of biomaterials for implantable devices.

Education 
Simmons completed a Bachelor of Engineering (Mechanical) at the University of Queensland, followed by a Master of Biomedical Engineering at UNSW. She subsequently graduated from UNSW with a PhD in Biomedical Engineering.

Career 
On completion of her masters degree, Simmons worked in the medical devices industry, including with Nucleus and Telectronics. She returned to UNSW in 1999 to take up the role of Associate Professor in the Faculty of Engineering. In 2018 she became Pro Vice-Chancellor (Academic Excellence) at UNSW and in 2019 was appointed UNSW's inaugural provost.

In addition to her university role, she is chair of the Advisory Committee on Medical Devices at the Therapeutic Goods Administration (TGA).

Awards and recognition 
Simmons was appointed a Member of the Order of Australia in the 2013 Australia Day Honours for "significant service to biomedical engineering, as an academic and administrator". She was elected a Fellow of the Australian Academy of Technology and Engineering in 2015 and is a Fellow of Engineers Australia.

References 

Living people
Year of birth missing (living people)
University of Queensland alumni
University of New South Wales alumni
Academic staff of the University of New South Wales
Biomedical engineers
Australian women engineers